Strong Winds (German: Windstärke 9. Die Geschichte einer reichen Erbin) is a 1924 German silent film directed by Reinhold Schünzel and starring Maria Kamradek, Alwin Neuss and Albert Bennefeld.

The film's sets were designed by the art director Franz Schroedter.

Cast
 Maria Kamradek as Mabel Samson 
 Alwin Neuss as Flanaga, ihr Vetter 
 Albert Bennefeld
 Harry Halm
 Adolf Klein
 Rudolf Lettinger

References

Bibliography
 Hans-Michael Bock & Michael Töteberg. Das Ufa-Buch. Zweitausendeins, 1992.

External links 
 

1924 films
Films of the Weimar Republic
German silent feature films
Films directed by Reinhold Schünzel
German black-and-white films
UFA GmbH films